Nedelišće (Kajkavian: Nedelišče) is a village in Međimurje County, in northern Croatia, and the seat of the Municipality of Nedelišće, which also includes 10 other villages in the south-western part of Međimurje County.

Nedelišće itself is a suburban village located just outside the county seat, Čakovec, around 3 kilometres from the city's centre. Despite not being designated as either a city or a town, Nedelišće was the third most populated settlement in Međimurje County, after Čakovec and Prelog, with 4,320 inhabitants according to the 2011 census.

History 

Nedelišće was first mentioned in 1226, in the Donation of the Hungarian King Béla IV. The settlement was named after Sunday (local Kajkavian dialect: nedelja or nedela), since the local people worship The Holy Trinity to which their Catholic parish is dedicated.

In the Middle Ages, the place has developed into a market consisting of fairs and crafts. Between 1570 and 1586, Nedelišće was also the seat of one of the first Croatian printing offices. The first document about the establishment of a local school originates from 1660, when Međimurje was reigned by the Zrinski family. The local volunteer fire department was founded in 1908 and is the oldest in the municipality.

Geography 

The main road going through the municipality is the D3 state road, connecting it with Čakovec to the east and Varaždin. The D208 road branches off of D3 road in Nedelišće and connects it with Trnovec border crossing with Slovenia towards Ormož. There are also two railroads going through the municipality, one connecting Čakovec with the Slovenian town of Ormož to the west and the other one connecting the city with other Croatian cities such as Varaždin and Zagreb to the south.

Settlements 
Aside from Nedelišće itself, the municipality includes the following settlements:
 Črečan, population 434
 Dunjkovec, population 967
 Gornji Hrašćan, population 910
 Gornji Kuršanec, population 793
 Macinec, population 585
 Parag, population 1,187
 Pretetinec, population 541
 Pušćine, population 1.289
 Slakovec, population 559
 Trnovec, population 390

Culture and sport 
Nedelišće is also known as the host of some manifestations, most notably the largest annual business fair in Međimurje County, MESAP (Croatian: Međimurski sajam poduzetništva), which usually takes place in June and gathers various companies from all over the county.

The local sports and gymnastics centre, SGC Aton, is considered the best-equipped gymnastics centre in the north-western Croatia. The local sports teams include the football club NK Nedelišće, who play in the Croatian Third League, and the volleyball club OK Nedelišće, who play in the Second Croatian Volleyball League.

References

External links 
Official Web site of the Municipality of Nedelišće
Official Web site of the volleyball club OK Nedelišće
Official Web site of the SGC Aton

Populated places in Međimurje County
Municipalities of Croatia